Lars Roberg (4 January 1664 – 21 May 1742) was a Swedish physician and natural science researcher. He served as a professor of anatomy and medicine at Uppsala University.

Biography
Roberg was born  in Stockholm, Sweden. He was the son of the royal apothecary Daniel Roberg. He matriculated at Uppsala University at a young age in 1675, and left for a long foreign journey in 1680 to Germany, France and England, during which he studied at the  University of Wittenberg and University of Leiden. He completed his doctorate in medicine at Leiden in 1693.
He became a professor of anatomy and practical medicine at Uppsala University in 1697 and retained the chair until 1740. Lars Roberg was the teacher of Carl Linnaeus and Peter Artedi.

In 1708, he founded  a clinic for the purpose of facilitating the practical education of medical students. 
Nosocomium academicum at Oxenstiernska huset in Uppsala would later be merged into  the  Uppsala University Hospital. 

He was one of the first to be elected to the Royal Swedish Academy of Sciences after its formation in 1739. Lars Roberg died at Uppsala in 1742.

References

1664 births
1742 deaths
Physicians from Stockholm
Uppsala University alumni
University of Wittenberg alumni
Leiden University alumni
Academic staff of Uppsala University
17th-century Swedish physicians
18th-century Swedish physicians
Members of the Royal Swedish Academy of Sciences